Fayoum University (FU) (Jame'at al-fayoum) is a public university located in the Egyptian city of Faiyum in northern Egypt. From 1976 to 2005, Fayoum University was a public institution within the University of Cairo. In August 2005, it was established as an independent campus with 2,000 faculty members and enrollment of about 25. 000 students. The city of Fayoum is an oasis located approximately 63 miles southwest of Cairo and is noted for its agricultural production and tourism.

History 
In 1975, the Faculty of Education in Fayoum was established as one of the faculties affiliated to Cairo University.

In 2018, the university held a well-attended sand skiing event in Fayoum with students from around Egypt joining in.

Courses and Campus
Fayoum University offers undergraduate programs and graduate programs, as well as open education opportunities via its 14 faculties.

Faculties

Faculty of Education
Faculty of Agriculture
Faculty of Engineering
Faculty of Social Work
Faculty of Dar Al-Uloom
Faculty of Science
Faculty of Tourism and Hotels
Faculty of Specific Education
Faculty of Archaeology
Faculty of Medicine
Faculty of Arts
Faculty of Computer science and Information
Faculty of Early Childhood Education
Faculty of Nursing

University Facilities 
Library Facilities: Fayoum University libraries own more than 67043 Arabic books and 30366 foreign books.
Special Facilities: Teaching Hotel, Sports Hall, Student Activities Center, and the University Theatre

The University Hospital
With its full capacity of 350 beds, the Fayoum University Hospital renders top-notch medical services to the citizens of Fayoum. It is also a center for educational and medical services.

Governance and Administration

Fayoum university is a state-owned campus administrated by a president assisted by three vice-presidents.

Past Presidents
Professor Abdel Hamid Abdel Tawab (2011–present)
Professor Ahmed M. El Gohary (2008–2011)
Professor Galal M. Said (2005–2011)

References

External links
Official website
talaba4fayoum.com University's students biggest community on web

Faiyum
Universities in Egypt
Educational institutions established in 2005
2005 establishments in Egypt
Buildings and structures in Faiyum Governorate